Brian Linighan (born 2 November 1973) is an English former professional footballer who played as a defender. He started his career at Sheffield Wednesday, making just one appearance on 11 January 1994 and was sold to Bury in 1998. After that, he played for non-league sides Gainsborough Trinity, Worksop Town and Whitby Town. He is the younger brother of former Arsenal defender Andy Linighan and former Ipswich Town defender David Linighan, and has a twin brother John.

References

External links

1973 births
Living people
Footballers from Hartlepool
English footballers
Association football defenders
Premier League players
Sheffield Wednesday F.C. players
Bury F.C. players
Gainsborough Trinity F.C. players
Worksop Town F.C. players
Whitby Town F.C. players
Hallam F.C. players
People educated at English Martyrs School and Sixth Form College
Twin sportspeople
English twins